State Route 62 (SR 62) is a state highway in the U.S. state of California that cuts across the Little San Bernardino Mountains in Riverside and San Bernardino counties. It runs from Interstate 10 near White Water to the Arizona state line, passing through the city of Twentynine Palms and along the northern boundary of the Joshua Tree National Park.

Route description

The route cuts across the Little San Bernardino Mountains along southern San Bernardino County. Route 62 begins at a freeway-to-freeway interchange with Interstate 10 at the eastern end of the San Gorgonio Pass northwest of Palm Springs in Riverside County. It heads due north until its intersection with SR 247 in Yucca Valley, and then it heads east through the unincorporated community of Joshua Tree and the city of Twentynine Palms. In 1970, Route 62 ended at the eastern city limit of Twentynine Palms, but it was later extended along the northern boundary of the Joshua Tree National Park to meet Arizona State Route 95 in Parker, Arizona. East of Twentynine Palms, there is a sign warning drivers that there are no services for 100 miles/160 km until reaching Vidal Junction where SR 62 meets US 95. This is one of the most desolate stretches of highway in California, and consequently, the most heavily traveled portion is between I-10 and Twentynine Palms. Travelers between the eastern Coachella Valley and the river utilize that more desolate stretch as the fastest route to the resorts of the Colorado River, accessing it via California State Route 177 in Desert Center.

In 2014, the Palm Springs Desert Sun newspaper reported that a dozen marines from the Marine Corps Air Ground Combat Center Twentynine Palms have been killed in accidents on Highway 62 since 2007 (out of a total of 33 vehicle-related deaths among personnel at the base); the paper attributed the problem in part to the base's unusually remote location, leaving personnel few options for entertainment.

SR 62 is part of the California Freeway and Expressway System, and west of the military base is part of the National Highway System, a network of highways that are considered essential to the country's economy, defense, and mobility by the Federal Highway Administration. SR 62 is designated as a Blue Star Memorial Highway from Interstate 10 to Adobe Road in Twentynine Palms. SR 62 is known as the Twentynine Palms Highway from I-10 to SR 177.

History
The routing west of Twentynine Palms was added to the state highway system in phases, with the part from White Water to Morongo Valley added in 1935, and from Morongo Valley to Yucca Valley in 1959; both were designated as Route 187. From Yucca Valley to Twentynine Palms, Route 218 was added in 1961. In the 1964 state highway renumbering, SR 62 was designated from I-10 into the town of Twentynine Palms. The portion from Twentynine Palms to Arizona was added to SR 62 in 1970.

Major intersections

See also

References

External links

California @ AARoads.com - State Route 62
Caltrans: Route 62 highway conditions
California Highways: SR 62

062
State Route 062
State Route 062
Mojave Desert
062